Mick Ford (born 1 August 1952) is a British actor, screenwriter and playwright, best known for his portrayal of intellectual convict Archer in the cinema version of Scum.

Early life and education 
Ford was born on 1 August 1952 in Croydon, Surrey. His father, Noel Ford, fought on the front lines as a Desert Rat during World War II. He attended John Ruskin Grammar School as a teenager and later joined the National Youth Theatre, where he appeared in numerous plays, including the premieres of Zigger Zagger and The Secret Rapture.

Career 
After appearing in the 1978 film The Sailor's Return, Ford's best known role came in the 1979 film Scum. Set in a borstal, Ford plays the inmate Archer, an intelligent vegetarian trouble-maker who just wants to serve his time "In (his) own little way". Ford also had a role that year in the television film The Knowledge (for which he also performed the title song) in which he stars as an unemployed man who is encouraged by his girlfriend (Kim Taylforth) to apply to the Metropolitan Police Public Carriage Office to become a black cab driver. In 1980 he was the main character in the European TV-miniseries Caleb Williams by Herbert Wise. He also appeared opposite Trevor Howard in the film Light Years Away (1981), and appeared in the play, The Promise. His later film roles include Kim (1984), The Fourth Protocol (1987), How to Get Ahead in Advertising (1989) and Dracula the Messiah (2020).

Personal life
Ford was married to the director of St Pancras Community Centre, Ruth Roberts, with whom he had two children. Roberts died in September 2010. He later married former actress Rudi Davies, whose mother was novelist Beryl Bainbridge.

References

1952 births
Living people
English screenwriters
English male screenwriters
English television writers
English male film actors
English male television actors
People educated at John Ruskin Grammar School
National Youth Theatre members
British male television writers
People from Croydon